Amjad Khan (born February 25, 1980) is a Pakistani professional squash player.

He has won a total of 7 PSA titles. His last two being in 2000, first at the Pakistan circuit event II and followed by the Pakistan circuit event IV.

External links
 Ranking
 Amjad Iqbal
 

1980 births
Living people
Pakistani male squash players
Asian Games medalists in squash
Squash players at the 1998 Asian Games
Asian Games silver medalists for Pakistan
Medalists at the 1998 Asian Games